The eoeungeum or oungum  (어은금) is a stringed musical instrument invented and played in North Korea. It is between the size of a mandolin and a mandola, and commonly has four single  strings. It is a development in the 1960's from the traditional Korean instrument called hyangbipa.

References

Korean musical instruments
String instruments